Raymond Connell (16 October 1917 – 3 July 1968) was a South African cricketer. He played in seventeen first-class matches for Eastern Province from 1945/46 to 1952/53.

See also
 List of Eastern Province representative cricketers

References

External links
 

1917 births
1968 deaths
South African cricketers
Eastern Province cricketers
Cricketers from Port Elizabeth